"It's Probably Me" is a song originally released in 1992 as a collaboration by Sting featuring Eric Clapton, Michael Kamen, and David Sanborn. Released from the soundtrack to the action comedy film Lethal Weapon 3 in June 1992, the song reached number 20 on the US Billboard Album Rock Tracks chart and number 12 on Canada's RPM Top Singles chart. It was more successful in Europe, peaking at number one in Italy, number four in France and number six in the Netherlands.

Background and release
The song uses leitmotifs that were first used on the soundtrack for the original Lethal Weapon film, released five years earlier. It was released as a single and on the Lethal Weapon 3 movie soundtrack. It also appears on the Fields of Gold: The Best of Sting 1984-1994 international edition compilation album released in 1994, and on Sting's Duets album released in 2021. Sting rerecorded the song in 1993 for his Ten Summoner's Tales album without any of the other musicians.

Music video
A music video was released in mid 1992 featuring Sting, Eric Clapton, Michael Kamen and David Sanborn performing the track together while a few scenes of Lethal Weapon 3 are shown. The video snippets in where the quartet performs the song are shot in black and white. Clapton is also seen smoking a cigarette in the video and using his Zippo petrol lighter to create the opening rhythm instead of a drum set or programme.

Reception
Clapton, Sting and Kamen were nominated for a Grammy Award at the 35th Annual Grammy Awards for Best Song Written Specifically for a Motion Picture or for Television in 1993. At the 1993 MTV Movie Awards Sting and Clapton were both nominated for the Best Movie Song. The American music website AllMusic retrospectively rated the release with two out of five possible stars.

Track listings

Personnel
Musicians
 Sting – vocals, backing vocals, bass
 Eric Clapton – acoustic and electric guitar
 Steve Gadd – drums
 Michael Kamen – keyboards, strings arrangement
 Stephen McLaughlin – percussion
 David Sanborn – alto saxophone

Charts

Weekly charts

Year-end charts

Certifications

Release history

References

1992 singles
1992 songs
A&M Records singles
Eric Clapton songs
Number-one singles in Italy
Sting (musician) songs
Songs written by Eric Clapton
Songs written by Michael Kamen
Songs written by Sting (musician)
Lethal Weapon (franchise)